Frank James Clarke (15 July 1942 – 3 June 2022) was an English footballer. Clarke was the eldest of five brothers who all played in the Football League.

Career
After playing non-league football for Willenhall Town, he played in the Football League as a centre forward for Shrewsbury Town, Queens Park Rangers, Ipswich Town, and Carlisle United. He made his debut for Shrewsbury Town in 1962 and made 188 appearances for the club. His goal tally of 77 goals was joint-second on the club's all-time scorers list. He was inducted into Shrewsbury Town Hall of Fame.

His younger brothers Allan, Derek, Kelvin and Wayne all played in the Football League. Frank was the only one of the five who did not represent Walsall.

Personal life
After his retirement from football, Clarke returned to Shrewsbury and worked as a newsagent, and at the Adams Sports Centre in Wem as a supervisor for 28 years, until 2010.

Clarke died on 3 June 2022, at the age of 79, leaving wife Sylvia and two daughters.

References

1942 births
2022 deaths
People from Willenhall
English footballers
Association football forwards
English Football League players
Willenhall Town F.C. players
Shrewsbury Town F.C. players
Queens Park Rangers F.C. players
Ipswich Town F.C. players
Carlisle United F.C. players